Lea Marquez Peterson is an American politician serving on the Arizona Corporation Commission since 2019. Peterson was appointed by Governor Doug Ducey to replace Andy Tobin following his appointment as Director of the Arizona Department of Administration. Peterson was also the 2018 Republican nominee for Arizona's 2nd Congressional District in the U.S. House.

Peterson received her undergraduate degrees in Marketing and Entrepreneurship from the University of Arizona, and her Masters in Business Administration from Pepperdine University. From 2009 to 2018, Peterson served as CEO of the Tucson Hispanic Chamber of Commerce.

Peterson is the first Hispanic woman to hold statewide office in Arizona.

Peterson and her husband live in Tucson, Arizona with their two children.

Electoral history

References

External links
 Ballotpedia

1970 births
Arizona Republicans
Candidates in the 2018 United States elections
Living people
Pepperdine University alumni
People from Santa Fe, New Mexico
University of Arizona alumni